Asaphocrita aphidiella is a moth in the family Blastobasidae. It is found in North America, including British Columbia, Washington, California, Manitoba, Ontario, Quebec, Maine, New Hampshire and Ohio.

The wingspan is about 15 mm. The forewings are tawny reddish grey. The hindwings are shining, brownish grey with greenish and cupreous iridescence toward the base.

Larvae have been reared on the contents of Phylloxera galls on hickory.

References

Moths described in 1907
aphidiella